José Alberto Hernández Rojas (born 6 January 1977 in Chimalhuacán) is a Mexican footballer. He plays as a midfielder for Cruz Azul Hidalgo.

A versatile player most often used in defensive midfield, he was a part of the Cruz Azul team that reached the final of the Copa Libertadores in 2001. On the strength of that performance, he earned a call to the Mexico national team upon the first appointment of Javier Aguirre as national coach in June 2001. Hernández received his only cap in Aguirre's first match, a 1–0 win over the United States on July 1, 2001.

References

External links
 

1977 births
Living people
Footballers from the State of Mexico
Liga MX players
Club Necaxa footballers
Cruz Azul footballers
Atlético Morelia players
Association football midfielders
Mexican footballers